The 1994 Group was a coalition of smaller research-intensive universities in the United Kingdom, founded in 1994 to defend these universities' interests following the creation of the Russell Group by larger research-intensive universities earlier that year.

The 1994 Group originally represented seventeen universities, rising to nineteen, and then dropping to eleven. The group started to falter in 2012, when a number of high performing members left to join the Russell Group. The 1994 Group ultimately dissolved in November 2013.

Role
The group sought "to represent the views of its members on the current state and the future of higher education through discussions with the government, funding bodies, and other higher education interest groups" and "[made] its views known through its research publications and in the media".

University Alliance, million+, GuildHE and the Russell Group were its fellow university membership groups across the UK higher education sector.

Members at time of dissolution

Historical membership
The following table shows the membership of the group since its formation in 1994.

The University of Manchester Institute of Science and Technology (UMIST), which merged with the Victoria University of Manchester to form the University of Manchester, was a member of the 1994 Group until October 2004. The London School of Economics was also a member until 2006, and the University of Warwick until July 2008.  Durham University, University of Exeter, Queen Mary, University of London and University of York left in 2012. All have now joined the Russell Group. In October, the University of St Andrews and University of Bath withdrew from membership of the group. The University of Surrey also announced its intention to leave the group on 6 November 2012. On 19 December 2012 the University of Reading announced that it would cease to participate in the group, although its membership formally ended in July 2013.

1994 Group position in league tables

Governance and management structure
The 1994 Group was headed by a board made up of the heads of member institutions. The board met formally five times a year. In addition, an annual residential conference took place in the summer where longer-term strategic issues were discussed. The board had responsibility for determining strategy and agreeing all policy papers, position statements and consultation responses, and responsibility for the governance of all joint activity.

The chair was elected by board members for a three-year term of office. Professor Michael Farthing, vice-chancellor of University of Sussex, was elected chair in 2011. The chair was the national spokesperson for the group and represented its interests where a senior representative of the group was required. The chair had overall responsibility for the development and delivery of the communication strategy on behalf of the board.

The chair was assisted by a Chair's Advisory Group (CAG) elected from the board for a three-year period of office (initial membership was staggered to ensure a rolling change of membership). The CAG met on four occasions each year. CAG members had a general brief for assisting the chair in the development of all areas of group policy (including management of the relationship with the Policy Groups). The CAG had a central role in the development of relationships with government, funding bodies, and HE stakeholder organisations.

Policy groups
The 1994 Group had three high-level Policy Groups that met three times a year to discuss longer-term strategy and policy issues.

The 1994 Group's Student Experience Policy Group aimed to identify the key issues surrounding student experience in the HE sector, defining the 1994 Group's own position in this context, and identifying potential areas for research and activity in the future.

The Research and Enterprise Policy Group aimed to strengthen the research carried out by its members by investigating funding and other issues.

The Strategic Planning and Resources Policy Group developed policies and guidelines in response legislative and financial changes affecting the group's members.

Unions 94
Established in 2006, Unions 94 was a loose coalition of students' unions within the 1994 Group.

See also
 British university
 List of universities in the United Kingdom

Types of UK university
 Ancient university
 Red brick university
 Plate glass university
 Technological university
 Campus university

International groups of universities
 Association of American Universities
 Group of Eight
 Innovative Research Universities Australia
 U15 Group of Canadian Research Universities
 U15 (German universities)
 Universitas 21

References

External links 
 

College and university associations and consortia in the United Kingdom
1994 establishments in the United Kingdom
2013 disestablishments in the United Kingdom